Sisurcana olivobrunnea is a species of moth of the family Tortricidae. It is found in Peru.

The wingspan is about 21 mm. The ground colour of the forewings is olive grey with greyish brown strigulation (fine streaks). The hindwings are grey-brown, but more cream basally and costally.

Etymology
The species name refers to the colouration of the species and is derived from Latin olivea (meaning olive colour) and grisea (meaning grey).

References

Moths described in 2010
Sisurcana
Moths of South America
Taxa named by Józef Razowski